Basking Sharks were a synthesiser band that formed in 1980. Members Adrian Todd, Ged McPhail and Martyn Eames toured extensively throughout the UK. They used a variety of home-made electronic instruments supplemented by second hand synths that had been customised to provide unique sounds. On stage they always played “live” without the use of backing tracks. Their stage act included a slide show, films and computer visuals synced into the stage performance.  
Their music merged power pop with European influences and experimentation. They produced a single, an EP and an LP, numerous videos, and live recordings. A 'best of' CD, Back from the Deep Water was produced in 2004.
They supported John Peel at a Lancaster gig which prompted him to invite them to record at Maida Vale for his radio show.
In 1987 they separated to pursue different projects. Adrian and Martyn formed  the industrial technical band Degree 33. Ged moved to Newcastle upon Tyne joining Madam X.  
Today Adrian and Martyn are working on a new project encompassing old and new technology with a view to live performance and internet release. Ged is developing a recording studio in South Korea.
Basking Sharks are still a performing unit but play rarely.

Discography

Albums
Shark Island (1983), Raw Shark
Back From Deep Water (Sharkive: 1981 - 1987) (2003)

Singles
"Diamond Age" (1983), Fin
"Thrill of the Game" (1983), SRR

See also
 List of Peel sessions
 :Category:Peel Sessions recordings

References

External links
 Official Website

English pop music groups